Jamilah Gupwell (born 7 July 1986 in New Plymouth, New Zealand) is a New Zealand netball player. 

She played three years with the Capital Shakers (2005–07) in the National Bank Cup. 

She was also a member of the New Zealand U21 team from 2006 to 2007. 

Gupwell signed with the Central Pulse for the inaugural ANZ Championship in 2008. Despite a winless season that year, she was one only a few players retained for the 2009 season. Gupwell continues to play with the Central Pulse in 2010.  

She then moved up to Mount Maunganui for the 2011 ANZ Championship season to play for the Waikato Bay of Plenty Magic, where the team placed third after losing the preliminary final vs Northern Mystics. 

For 2012, Gupwell moved back to Wellington to play one more season for the Central Pulse. She then married Tomasi Palu (Tongan International Rugby player and Wellington Lions Rugby player) on 6 June 2015, and they have three daughters.

References

New Zealand netball players
Central Pulse players
Sportspeople from New Plymouth
1986 births
Living people
ANZ Championship players
People educated at New Plymouth Girls' High School
Capital Shakers players
Waikato Bay of Plenty Magic players